William George Mahony (1877 – 28 August 1962) was an Australian politician.

Born in Ireland, Mahony migrated to Australia as a child. He was raised in Balmain, where he received a primary education before becoming a grocer's assistant. He was the first secretary of the Grocers' Assistants' Union, and was involved in its amalgamation into the Shop Assistants' Union.

In the by-election that resulted from the death of Robert Howe in 1915, Mahony was elected unopposed to the Australian House of Representatives as the Labor member for Dalley. He held the seat until 1927, when he resigned and was succeeded by the former Premier of Queensland, Ted Theodore. Following his resignation, he purchased a sub-lease of the Commercial Hotel at Balmain East in June 1927, but sold it again in November.

A 1928 Royal Commission found that Mahony had been bribed to resign from the Parliament, probably by or for Theodore, but proof was never found. Mahony had emphatically denied the allegations, and claimed that he had won the money gambling on horse-racing. He attempted to make a comeback at the 1928 federal election, but was defeated for Labor preselection to contest a New South Wales seat in the Australian Senate.

In 1929, Mahony was working as a casual assistant in the ambulance room at the Cockatoo Island Dockyard. In the 1940s, Mahony was the industrial organiser for the Australian Red Cross. His wife, Annie, died in 1942; their only son John died at 36 in 1946, and their daughter Amy in 1948. Mahony died in 1962.

His brother, Robert Mahony, was a member of the New South Wales Legislative Council.

References

Australian Labor Party members of the Parliament of Australia
Members of the Australian House of Representatives for Dalley
Members of the Australian House of Representatives
1877 births
1962 deaths
20th-century Australian politicians
19th-century Australian politicians
Irish emigrants to Australia (before 1923)